The Embassy of Mongolia in London is the diplomatic mission of Mongolia in the United Kingdom. Relations between the two countries dates from 1963.

Gallery

References

External links

Official site

Mongolia
Diplomatic missions of Mongolia
Mongolia–United Kingdom relations
Buildings and structures in the Royal Borough of Kensington and Chelsea
South Kensington